Gerard Aichorn (born 19 December 1953) is an Austrian retired footballer.

References

Austrian footballers
Association football defenders
Association football midfielders
Living people
1953 births
FC Den Bosch players